The Satsop Hills are foothills of the Olympic Mountains in Mason County, Washington north of Matlock, Washington, between Wynoochee Lake to the west and Lake Cushman to the east.

Geography

The Satsop River, with a  watershed, rises in the hills and flows south to the Chehalis River. Where the river rises,  of annual precipitation qualifies as a temperate rainforest, a term used applied to the Satsop watershed by some publications. The Wynoochee Oxbow meteorological station on the west end of the hills has both the highest average annual rainfall and the second highest ever recorded in the continental United States. The hills lie partly in the Olympic National Forest but not quite in the Olympic National Park. In a 1916 geological survey, hills in the vicinity of Matlock were included with the Black Hills of Thurston County, but may have been describing formations on the East Fork of the Satsop, to the south of the area described above.

Peaks

Peaks in the Satsop Hills include:

History

Forest fires have struck the hills repeatedly. The term "Satsop hills" has been used at least since 1885 when the Morning Oregonian used it to describe the location of forest fires. 

In September, 1902, "catastrophic" fires burned across Southwest Washington, including a burn from Elma to Shelton on Puget Sound that destroyed one million board feet of lumber at a mill in the hills above Elma, and uncounted volumes of live trees. On September 12, the county seat, Montesano experienced darkness at noon. A one- to two-mile wide swath of timber was completely burned from Elma to Summit Lake, 13 miles west. 

Several fire lookouts were built on peaks in the 20th century as listed above as part of a national effort to control fires.

Fugitive John Tornow
The hills were the hideout of John Tornow, a fugitive who lived in the hills for 19 months in the 1910s. He was accused of murdering several people including two nephews, and was eventually found and killed there by the then Chehalis County sheriff's deputy in 1913.

Transportation
The hills are crossed by extensive logging roads and an abandoned logging railroad formerly operated by Simpson Timber Company.

Wildlife
Deer and Roosevelt Elk herds are in the hills, as well as black bear, cougars and game birds including grouse and "the largest population of mountain quail in the state". Elk are probably migratory and move in and out of the Olympic National Park.

Sasquatch are reported to live in the hills, with 22 reported sightings as of 2014, including a case discovered by a sheriff's deputy in 1982 and investigated by an Idaho State University biologist in 2004.

Recreation

Recreation in the hills includes canoeing and kayaking, camping, fishing, hunting and hiking. Hiking destinations noted in printed and online guides include Satsop Lakes, Spoon Creek Falls, South Mountain, a  "moderately well known winter hiking destination" in Mason County, and Vance Creek Bridge, "made famous from millions of Instagram, Facebook, Tumblr and Twitter images" and though on closed private land, was "one of the more popular destinations on the Olympic Peninsula".

The Grays Harbor County high point is a  peak near a slightly higher peak in Mason County unofficially named , sought by highpointing enthusiasts; it is on the Grays Harbor–Mason County line in the Satsop Hills or nearby in the adjacent Wynoochee watershed.

Footnotes

References
Notes

Sources

 – 1941 original hand-penned map, 1965 third revision

External links
Walks with Moss: South Mountain hike report

Landforms of Mason County, Washington
Hills of Washington (state)